David Hieronymus Grindel (1776-1836) was a botanist (bryologist).

Plant genus Grindelia is named after the botanist.

References

1776 births
1836 deaths
Bryologists
Latvian botanists